Alexander Prosvirnin (24 August 1964 – 15 August 2010) was a Soviet (Ukrainian) Nordic combined skier who competed in the early 1980s. He was born in Vorokhta. He won a bronze medal in the 3x10 km team event at the 1984 FIS Nordic World Ski Championships in Rovaniemi and finished 14th in the 15 km individual event at the 1985 championships in Seefeld.

Prosvirnin finished sixth in the individual event at the 1984 Winter Olympics in Sarajevo. His best individual finish was second in East Germany in 1983.

External links

Alexander Prosvirnin's profile at Sports-Reference.com
Mention of Alexander Prosvirnin's death

Soviet male Nordic combined skiers
Olympic Nordic combined skiers of the Soviet Union
Nordic combined skiers at the 1984 Winter Olympics
1964 births
2010 deaths
FIS Nordic World Ski Championships medalists in Nordic combined
Universiade medalists in nordic combined
Universiade silver medalists for the Soviet Union
Competitors at the 1985 Winter Universiade